Mukluks or kamik (singular:  ,) are a soft boot, traditionally made of reindeer (caribou) skin or sealskin, and worn by Arctic aboriginal people, including the Inuit, Iñupiat, and Yup'ik. 

Mukluks may be worn over an inner boot liner and under a protective overshoe. The term mukluk is often used for any soft boot designed for cold weather, and modern designs may use both traditional and modern materials.

Related boots
Soft-soled boots, of similar materials (mostly sealskin and caribou-skin) and designs, but with local variations, are traditionally worn in circumpolar areas. These include the North American Arctic, including Greenland, the European Arctic, including Fennoscandia, and Siberia.

Another type of boot, sometimes called an Inuit boot, originating in Greenland and the eastern part of Alaska, is made by binding it with animal cartilage, and has a centre seam running down to the foot of the boot.

Another type has a soft leather sole, but the upper is knitted out of wool or a wool-rayon blend. Often called "slipper socks", these are traditionally worn by the people of the Hindu Kush Mountains.

Use

As mukluks are soft-soled, and flex with the feet, they allow hunters to move very quietly. A wearer can run, tip-toe, and even dance in mukluks. They are also designed for use in the tundra.

Mukluks weigh little. While, for instance, U.S. Marine extreme-cold-weather boots weigh , soft-soled boots made using modern materials weigh less than a tenth of that. Lighter shoes also allow for more efficient running.

Care

Fur garments, including kamiks, are modernly stored in an unheated annexe. In a home with forced-air heating, the interior air is warm and very dry. The warmth and dryness would cause the furs to deteriorate quickly. On sunny days they are aired outside, especially in spring. After a season's storage, traditional skin kamiks tend to stiffen and need to be worked and stretched to make them pliable again.

Allowing traditional boots to dry between uses hinders rot, letting the boots last longer. Multiple pairs can be worn in rotation to allow them more time to dry.

Design
Because mukluks weigh little, there is no need for heavy lacing; friction is enough to hold them on the foot. Some mukluks are very lightly laced (through external loops sewn into the seams, so as not to leak). They may be laced over the arch of the foot, or around the top of the boot to stiffen it. Many, however, are designed without lacing, to avoid constricting the circulation and making the foot cold. The top of the boot stands up somewhat stiffly, and may be open at the top, which allows moisture to escape.

Mukluks are often made with a wrapped sole, so that the seam around the sole is on the top and sides of the boot, not on the bottom edge. This helps avoid wear on the seams and leaks. 

Kamiks made for cold, dry winter weather may have fur low down on the outside, and other features that would be a problem when not on dry, powdery snow. Kamiks for warm, slushy, muddy, or open-ocean conditions are stitched finely from waterproof sealskin (see illustration above). 

The short overshoes may also be made waterproof for wet conditions or furry and grippy for dry ones. The inner boots are often made with the fur facing inwards. They are worn without socks, because socks absorb and hold sweat.

Mukluks may be adorned with pompons, beads, embroidery, and other techniques.

The design of the mukluk is used for the industrial manufacture of some other cold-weather boots, especially paired with a rugged contemporary sole. The key component of the overall success of the mukluk design is its ability to breathe, that is, to allow air exchange. This is an advantage in extremely cold conditions where perspiration may become a factor in frostbite on one's feet. Their bulkiness, paired with their poor performance in slush (they keep snow out, but water quickly soaks through), makes them less ideal for the casual winter wearer.

Manufacture

Usually, the uppers of summer kamik are made ringed seal skin, while the soles are made of bearded seal, which is tougher. Winter kamik are often made of caribou leg fur; caribou, unlike seals, rely on fur rather than blubber for insulation, so their fur is warmer. 

The skin requires laborious preparation. Seals must be skinned, and the skins blubbered, washed in dish soap, scraped to clean them, hung to drain, and then stretched to dry outside. The skins may be bleached in the sun, and for summer kamik, they are generally scraped clean of fur to allow watertight stitching. Blind-stitching (not piercing the full depth of the skin) with sinew, which shrinks when wet, helps keep mukluks watertight. Commercial boots of modern materials will often require seam-sealing after purchase if they are to be fully waterproof.

For insulation, mukluks may be lined with furs such as caribou, rabbit, fox and raccoon. Commercial sheepskin may be used to line and sole boots, as of the first decade of the 20th century. Down, polyester, and closed-celled EVA foam is also used in soft-soled boots. The inner boot may also be made of textile, or wool felt.

Gallery

See also 

 Inuit clothing#Footwear
 Ugg boots
 Yup'ik clothing

References 

Folk footwear
Boots
Inuit clothing
Yupik culture